Highfield Rugby Football Club is a rugby union club based in Cork, Ireland, playing in Division 1B of the All-Ireland League. The club was founded in 1930 and was elevated to senior status in the province of Munster in 1953.  Before moving to its present grounds at Woodleigh Park, the club was based in fields off Magazine Road between Highfield Avenue and Highfield West, where the team derived its name. The current ground is now located near a park called Highfield Lawn. The club currently fields teams in Division 1B of the All-Ireland League. Irish Rugby union International, Donncha O'Callaghan, is a product of the Highfield Youth system.

The club also has a women's team who participate in Division 1 of the All Ireland League (AIL), featuring two former Irish International players, Laura Guest and Heather O'Brien who were part of the 2013 Six Nations Grand Slam winning team.  The Munster Cup competition was retired in 2013 meaning that the club retain the cup as they were the holders in that season.

Facility
In January 2011, Highfield RFC unveiled a new flood-lit, all-weather facility; comprising 3 'state-of-the-art' astro-turf pitches. These pitches are available to all Highfield teams for training and allow training programmes during the winter months.
The pitches are also used for 5 a-side soccer, tag rugby and other sports and activities. In 2019 a new, state-of-the-art gym was added at the grounds.

Honours

Senior team
Munster Senior League - 1990 
Munster Senior Cup (2) - 1966 and 1968

Junior team
 All-Ireland Under-18 champions - 2009
 Munster Junior League Champions - 2002, 2014
 Munster Junior Cup (5) - 1937, 1942, 1945, 1972, 2019

Women's team
 Munster Cup (2) - 2005, 2013
 National Women's Cup - 2013

References

Irish rugby union teams
Rugby union clubs in County Cork
Rugby clubs established in 1930
Senior Irish rugby clubs (Munster)